Dreams of Love or Dream of Love may refer to:

Film and television
 Dream of Love, a 1928 American biopic about Maurice de Saxe
 Dreams of Love (1935 film), a Mexican biopic about Franz Liszt
 Dreams of Love (1947 film), a French biopic about Franz Liszt
 Dreams of Love – Liszt, a 1970 Hungarian-Soviet biopic about Franz Liszt
 "Dream of Love" (Adventure Time), a television episode

Music
 Liebesträume (Dreams of Love), a set of three solo piano works by Franz Liszt

See also
 Dreams of a Love, a 1977 album by The Ferrets